The 2016–17 1. FC Union Berlin season is the 51st season in the football club's history. For the 7th consecutive season, Union Berlin play in the 2. Bundesliga. They also participated in this season's edition of the domestic cup, the DFB-Pokal. The season covers a period from 1 July 2016 to 30 June 2017.

Players

Squad

Competitions

2. Bundesliga

League table

Results summary

Results by round

Matches

DFB-Pokal

References

1. FC Union Berlin seasons
Union Berlin, 1. FC